Jan Christopher Rühr (born 19 December 1993) is a German field hockey player who plays as a forward for Rot-Weiss Köln and the Germany national team.

Rühr was awarded the FIH Rising Star of the Year Award in 2013 and 2015. He represented his country at the 2016 Summer Olympics, where he won the bronze medal.

He was educated at Seaford College.

Career
Rühr played in his childhood as his 3 older siblings at Kahlenberger HTC, he played in the youth of Uhlenhorst Mülheim for 10 years and in the 2014–15 season in Hamburg for Club an der Alster for one year. He was voted "talent of the world" in January 2014, moved to Rot-Weiss Köln in 2015 and won the German field hockey championship in his first season with the Cologne team. In January 2016, he was voted the "Rising Star" (Best Youth Player of the World) for the second time. On 28 May 2021, he was named in the squads for the 2021 EuroHockey Championship and the 2020 Summer Olympics.

References

External links
 
 
 

1993 births
Living people
People educated at Seaford College
German male field hockey players
Male field hockey forwards
2014 Men's Hockey World Cup players
Field hockey players at the 2016 Summer Olympics
Field hockey players at the 2020 Summer Olympics
2018 Men's Hockey World Cup players
Olympic field hockey players of Germany
Olympic bronze medalists for Germany
Olympic medalists in field hockey
Medalists at the 2016 Summer Olympics
Sportspeople from Düsseldorf
Expatriate field hockey players
German expatriates in India
Hockey India League players
HTC Uhlenhorst Mülheim players
Der Club an der Alster players
Rot-Weiss Köln players
2018 FIH Indoor Hockey World Cup players
2023 Men's FIH Hockey World Cup players
21st-century German people